Sorghum × drummondii (Sudan grass),  is a hybrid-derived species of grass raised for forage and grain, native to tropical and subtropical regions of Eastern Africa. It may also be known as Sorghum bicolor × Sorghum arundinaceum after its parents. Some authorities consider all three species to be subspecies under S. bicolor.

The plant is cultivated in Southern Europe, South America, Central America, North America and Southern Asia, for forage or as a cover crop. When treated as a weed, it is known as shattercane. It is distinguished from the grain sorghum (Sorghum bicolor) by the grain (caryopsis) not being exposed at maturity.

References

Biogas substrates
drummondii
Tropical agriculture
Hybrid plants